Florence A. Reuter (born 20 December 1969) is a Belgian Reformist politician who is currently the Mayor of Waterloo.

Political career 
The 6 March 2015, she was sworn in and became mayor of Waterloo, following the resignation of Serge Kubla and his indictment for corruption.

References 

1969 births
Living people
Reformist Movement politicians
21st-century Belgian politicians
21st-century Belgian women politicians
Vrije Universiteit Brussel alumni
21st-century Belgian journalists
Mayors of places in Belgium
Women mayors of places in Belgium